Twitterature (a portmanteau of Twitter and literature) is a literary use of the microblogging service of Twitter. It includes various genres, including aphorisms, poetry, and fiction (or some combination thereof) written by individuals or collaboratively. The 280-character maximum imposed by the medium, upgraded from 140 characters in late 2017, provides a creative challenge.

Genres

Aphorism

Aphorisms are popular because their brevity is inherently suited to Twitter. People often share well-known classic aphorisms on Twitter, but some also seek to craft and share their own brief insights on every conceivable topic. Boing Boing has described Twitter as encouraging "a new age of the aphorism", citing the novel aphorisms of Aaron Haspel.

Poetry

Haiku are a brief poetic form well suited to Twitter; many examples can be found using the hashtag #haiku. Other forms of poetry can be found under other hashtags or by "following" people who use their Twitter accounts for journals or poetry. For example, the Swedish poet and journalist Göran Greider tweets observations and poems using the Twitter handle @GreiderDD (Göran Greider) as shown in the example on the right.

Fiction
Twitterature fiction includes 140-character stories, fan fiction, the retelling of literary classics and legends, twitter novels, and collaborative works. The terms "twiction" and "tweet fic" (Twitter fiction), "twiller" (Twitter thriller), and "phweeting" (fake tweeting) also exist to describe particular twitterature fiction genres.

140-character stories: fiction that fits into a single tweet. An example of these stories are those written by James Mark Miller (@asmallfiction), Sean Hill (@veryshortstories), and Arjun Basu (@arjunbasu). A number of Twitter journals dedicate themselves to the form. In 2013, The Guardian challenged traditionally published authors such as Jeffrey Archer and Ian Rankin to write their 140-character stories, and then featured their attempts.

Fan fiction: Twitter accounts that have been created for characters in films, TV series, and books. Some of these accounts take the events in the original works as their starting point, whereas others may branch into fan fiction.

Literary classics and legends 
Literary classics and legends are retold on Twitter, either by characters' tweeting and interacting, or by retelling in tweet format, often in modern language using slang. For instance,  in 2010, a group of rabbis tweeted the Exodus, with the hashtag #TweetTheExodus; and in 2011, the Royal Shakespeare Company and the English game company Mudlark tweeted the story of Romeo and Juliet. In 2009, Alexander Aciman and Emmett Rensin published Twitterature: The World's Greatest Books Retold Through Twitter.

Epicretold, by author Chindu Sreedharan, is another noteworthy work in this genre. The New Indian Express called it an “audacious attempt...to fit the mother of all epics, the Mahabharata, into the microblogging site Twitter.” Tweeted from @epicretold, and subsequently published as a full-length book by HarperCollins India, the story was narrated in "2,628 tweets" between July 2009 to October 2014. In an interview with Time, Sreedharan said it was an attempt to simplify the lengthy epic and make it accessible to the new generation—both in India and abroad.

Twitter novels 

Twitter novels (or twovels) are another form of fiction that can extend over hundreds of tweets to tell a longer story. The author of a Twitter novel is often unknown to the readers, as anonymity creates an air of authenticity. As such, the account name can often be a pseudonym or even a character in the story. Twitter novels can run for months, with one or more tweets daily, whereby context is usually maintained by a unique hashtag. Searching by the corresponding hashtag produces a list of all available tweets in the series. Some serials are posted in short updates that encourage the reader to follow and to speculate on the next installment.

One example of the Twitter novel is Small Places by Nick Belardes (@smallplaces), which began on April 25, 2008 with the tweet as shown on the right. Another example is The Twitstery Twilogy series by Robert K. Blechman (@RKBs_Twitstery). The first entry in the series was Executive Severance, which would be the first live-tweeted Twitter comic mystery (or "Twitstery"), beginning on May 6, 2009 with the tweet shown. The second Twitter novel in the series, The Golden Parachute, appeared as a Kindle eBook in 2016; and the third and concluding novel, I Tweet, Therefore I am, the Book 3, was released early in 2017.

John Roderick's Electric Aphorisms was composed in individual tweets between December 2008 and May 2009, and deleted on publication of the book itself by Publication Studio in November 2009. Traditionally-published authors have also attempted the twitter novel, such as Jennifer Egan's Black Box, which was first published in about 500 tweets in 2012; and David Mitchell's The Right Sort, first published as almost 300 tweets sent over one week in 2014. Hari Manev, who does not use Twitter, published his twitter novel The Eye, which is the first volume in his The Meaning of Fruth twitter trilogy, as a Kindle eBook in 2019.

Collaborative works 
Neil Gaiman coined the term "interactive twovel" for an experiment in involving his Twitter followers in collaborating with him on a novel. This was conducted with BBC America Audio Books. The first tweet from Gaiman was as shown on the right. Then, he invited his readers to continue the story under the hashtag #bbcawdio. The result was published as an audiobook under the title Hearts, Keys and Puppetry, with the author given as Neil Gaiman & Twitterverse. Teju Cole sent lines from his short story "Hafiz" to other Twitter users and then retweeted them to assemble the story.

Weird Twitter
 
Weird Twitter is a loose genre of internet humour dedicated to publication of humorous material on Twitter that is disorganised and hard to explain. Related to anti-humour and created primarily by Twitter users who are not professional humourists, Weird Twitter–style jokes may be presented as disorganised thoughts, rather than in a conventional joke format or punctuated sentence structure. The genre is based around the restriction of Twitter's 280-character (previously 140) message length, requiring jokes to be quite short. The genre may also include repurposing of overlooked material on the internet, such as parodying posts made by spambots or deliberately amateurish images created in Paint. The New York Times has described the genre as "inane" and intended "to subtly mock the site's corporate and mainstream users." Some sections of Weird Twitter may be dedicated to a certain subculture or worldview, such as Traditionalist Catholicism.

History
Twitter was launched in the year of 2006, and the first Twitter novels appeared in 2008. The origins of the term Twitterature are hard to determine, but it was popularized by Aciman and Rensin's book. Since then, the phenomenon has been discussed in the arts and culture sections of several major newspapers.

Twitterature has been called a literary genre but is more accurately an adaptation of various genres to social media. The writing is often experimental or playful, with some authors or initiators seeking to find out how the medium of Twitter affects storytelling or how a story spreads through the medium. A Swedish site titled Nanoismer.se was launched in 2011 to "challenge people to write deeper than what Twitter is for."

References

Further reading
Aciman, A., and E. Rensin. 2009. Twitterature: The World's Greatest Books Retold Through Twitter. Penguin Books.

Electronic literature
Twitter
Computer-related introductions in 2008
2000s neologisms
Weird Twitter

Short story types